Carlos Henrique Dias (born 22 June 1980), nicknamed Kim, is a Brazilian former professional footballer who played as a striker.

He played for, among others, Atlético Mineiro in his home country of Brazil, Al-Ahli in Saudi Arabia and AS Nancy in France.

Playing career

Atlético Mineiro
Born in Juiz de Fora, Kim started his professional career at Atlético Mineiro at the age of just 20. He played professionally for the club for three years in the Campeonato Brasileiro Série A before moving to Saudi Arabia in 2003. Overall, he played in 55 league matches for the Belo Horizonte club, netting 10 goals.
In his first season, he helped the club win their 38th Campeonato Mineiro title.

Nancy
Kim arrived in Nancy in 2005 after a short spell in Saudi Arabia with Al-Ahli. Kim arrived at AS Nancy just after they won promotion to Ligue 1 after finishing first in Ligue 2. In his first season at the club he helped them reach the final of the Coupe de la Ligue against OGC Nice. Kim started the game at the Stade de France in Saint-Denis and went on to score the game's winning goal in the 65th minute. He was taken off in the 90th minute to rapturous applause.

This propelled the team into the UEFA Cup in 2007 with the club reaching the Round of 16 before being knocked out by Shakhtar Donetsk.
Overall Kim's time in France was less successful only netting 11 time in 74 Ligue 1 appearances.

Al-Arabi
At the end of the 2007–08 Ligue 1 season, Kim left AS Nancy for Al-Arabi in Doha, Qatar. In his first season with the club he helped them lift the Qatar Sheikh Jassem Cup. In that season, he helped them finish 6th in the Qatar Stars League.

Honours
 Campeonato Mineiro: 2000
 Arab Champions League: 2003
 Coupe de la Ligue: 2006
 Qatar Sheikh Jassem Cup: 2008

References

External links
 
 
 

1980 births
Living people
People from Juiz de Fora
Brazilian footballers
Brazilian expatriate footballers
Association football forwards
Campeonato Brasileiro Série A players
Clube Atlético Mineiro players
CR Vasco da Gama players
Clube Náutico Capibaribe players
Joinville Esporte Clube players
AS Nancy Lorraine players
Ligue 1 players
Expatriate footballers in France
Expatriate footballers in Qatar
Al-Arabi SC (Qatar) players
Al-Ahli Saudi FC players
Qatar Stars League players
Saudi Professional League players